New York's 12th congressional district is a congressional district for the United States House of Representatives located in New York City. As of 2023, it is represented by Democrat Jerry Nadler, redistricted incumbent of the former 10th congressional district who defeated incumbent Carolyn Maloney in the August 2022 Democratic primary. The redrawn District 12 includes the Upper West Side constituency (former District 10) represented by Nadler since the 1990s, the Upper East Side, and all of Midtown Manhattan.

Pre-redistricting, the district included several neighborhoods in the East Side of Manhattan, the Greenpoint section of Brooklyn, and western Queens, as well as Roosevelt Island, mostly overlapping the pre-redistricting 14th district. The 12th district's per capita income, in excess of $75,000, is the highest among all congressional districts in the United States.

Voting

History
During the Civil War, the 12th District comprised the counties of Dutchess and Columbia. The 12th District eventually became a Brooklyn district in the mid-1960s, as the result of a district realignment due to the Supreme Court's decision in the Cooper v. Power case in 1966. The district was realigned to include majority African American neighborhoods such as Bedford-Stuyvesant in Central Brooklyn. Until 1992, it was the Central Brooklyn district now held by Yvette Clarke (and formerly by Major Owens), and then remapped to include Hispanic neighborhoods in Lower Manhattan and Queens.

1803–1913:
Dutchess County, Columbia County
1913–1945:
Parts of Manhattan
1945–1993:
Parts of Brooklyn
1993–2023:
Parts of Brooklyn, Manhattan, Queens
2023–:
Parts of Manhattan

From 2003 to 2013 it included parts of Brooklyn, Queens, and Manhattan.  It included the Queens neighborhoods of Maspeth, Ridgewood, and Woodside; the Brooklyn neighborhoods of Bushwick, Greenpoint, Red Hook, East New York, Brooklyn Heights, Sunset Park, and Williamsburg; and part of Manhattan's Lower East Side and East Village.

List of members representing the district

1803–1813: One seat

1813–1823: two seats
From 1813 to 1823, two seats were apportioned to the District, elected at-large on a general ticket.

1823 – present: One seat

Recent elections 

In New York, are numerous minor parties at various points on the political spectrum. Certain parties will invariably endorse either the Republican or Democratic candidate for every office, hence the state electoral results contain both the party votes, and the final candidate votes (Listed as "Recap").

Historical district boundaries

See also

List of United States congressional districts
New York's congressional districts
United States congressional delegations from New York

Notes

References 

 Congressional Biographical Directory of the United States 1774–present
 2004 House election data Clerk of the House of Representatives
 2002 House election data "
 2000 House election data "
 1998 House election data "
 1996 House election data "

12
Constituencies established in 1803
1803 establishments in New York (state)